Kouyeya is a small town in eastern Guinea in Coyah Prefecture near the Sombouya Valley. As of 1989, it had a population of 884.

References

Populated places in Guinea